Sivalokanathar Temple (சிவலோகநாதர் கோயில்) is a Hindu temple in the Indian state of Tamil Nadu. It is dedicated to the god Shiva. The temple is situated in the village of Tirupunkur or Thirupunkur which lies about 3 miles west of Vaitheeswaran Koil. The temple is associated with the legend of the Saivite saint Nandanar who was one of the 63 Nayanmars. While being a Dalit, Nandanar was not allowed inside the temple, the idol of Nandi within the temple precincts moved  a few inches at the command of Shiva so as not to obstruct Nandanar's view from the gate of the shrine.

Literary mention 
Tirunavukkarasar describes the feature of the deity of Tirupunkur and Thiruneedur as:

Notes

References 

 

Shiva temples in Mayiladuthurai district
Padal Petra Stalam